William John Boston, MBE (born 6 August 1934) is a Welsh former professional rugby league footballer who played as a  or . Born in Cardiff, Wales, Boston started his career as a rugby union player before joining Wigan in 1953. He spent the next 15 years at Wigan, where he scored a club-record 478 tries in his 488 appearances for the club. He finished his career at Blackpool Borough before retiring in 1970. He also represented Great Britain in 31 Test matches, and was part of the team that won the 1960 Rugby League World Cup.

Regarded as one of the sport's greatest ever players, Boston scored a total of 571 tries in his career, making him the second-highest try scorer in rugby league history. He is an original inductee of the British Rugby League Hall of Fame, Welsh Sports Hall of Fame and Wigan Warriors Hall of Fame, and was appointed Member of the Order of the British Empire (MBE) in the 1996 Birthday Honours "for services to the community in Wigan, Greater Manchester."

Early life
Born on 6 August 1934 at Angelina Street, Butetown, Cardiff, Boston was the sixth of eleven children born to John Boston (a merchant seaman from Sierra Leone) and Nellie who came from Cardiff's Irish community.

Rugby Union
Boston began his rugby union career with the newly formed Cardiff Internationals Athletic Club. CIACS (pronounced "kayaks") represented Grangetown, Cardiff Bay, Butetown and the Docks areas of the city, and the team's makeup reflected the multinational nature of those communities. Boston also represented the Cardiff Schoolboys team in the late 1940s and went on to represent Wales in both the boys clubs' internationals and at Youth level. The young Boston was an integral part of the CIACs "invincible" season of 1951–52, where the team won all of their 32 games. Boston was already attracting attention and was given opportunities at two famous Welsh clubs, representing Neath RFC in 1950 and Pontypridd RFC in 1952. However, Boston repeatedly stated his wishes to represent Cardiff RFC, telling one journalist that he cried after signing for Wigan as he knew his dreams of playing rugby union for Cardiff and Wales were over.

The lack of an offer from Cardiff remains a contentious issue. As Cardiff passed on other black and mixed race players from CIACs and the docks area (like Johnny Freeman and Colin Dixon, who both had successful rugby league careers), it has been suggested that the club had an issue with racism.

Rugby League career
Boston was called up for National Service with the Royal Signals at Catterick, North Yorkshire, and was scouted by a number of Rugby League clubs. On 13 March 1953 Wigan chairman Joe Taylor and vice-chairman Billy Gore travelled to Boston's home in Cardiff and offered him £1,000 to sign for them. Although that was very large offer, Boston's mother rejected it on his behalf. A second offer of £1,500 was made in cash, and the money was spread out on the table in five pound notes to show the family how much money it was. Boston later stated that he still didn't want to sign the contract and his mother told him "Don't worry son, I'll get rid of them for you. I'll ask them for so much that they'll go home." Boston's mother told the delegation that Billy would only sign for £3,000, double the increased offer. Within a minute the delegation agreed to the terms. Boston stated that he still did not want to sign, but his mother had given their word, and Boston signed the contract.

Boston made his 'A' team début a crowd of 8,000 assembled inside Central Park, Wigan. He made his first team début against Barrow in November 1953 scoring a try.

Billy Boston played  in Wigan's 8–13 defeat by Oldham in the 1957–58 Lancashire Cup Final during the at Station Road, Swinton on Saturday 19 October 1957.

For the next fifteen seasons he was a living legend and played his final game in 1968. Both players scored two tries in Wigan's 1959–60 Northern Rugby Football League season Championship final victory. Boston had an astonishing turn of speed for a big man and had the ultimate side step and was also able to hand off opponents with apparent ease.

Boston also played 31 games for Great Britain, and was the first player to score four tries in a game against New Zealand. He was the first non-white player to be selected to tour Australia and New Zealand in 1954, on which he set a new record of 36 tries in 18 games. Boston also played in the 1962 tour, scoring a further 22 tries.

Billy Boston also represented Great Britain while at Wigan between 1952 and 1956 against France (1 non-Test match).

With BBC television coverage increasing in the late-1950s, armchair fans as well as terrace supporters were able to witness Billy Boston in action. He beat Johnny Ring's record of 368 tries and went on to score a record 478 for Wigan], a record that will probably never be broken. Boston also twice equalled the then Wigan club record of seven tries in a game, only surpassed since by Martin Offiah and Shaun Edwards.

Billy Boston played left- in Wigan's 13–9 victory over Workington Town in the 1957–58 Challenge Cup Final at Wembley Stadium, London on Saturday 10 May 1958, in front of a crowd of 66,109 played  and scored two-tries in the 30–13 victory over Hull F.C. in the 1958–59 Challenge Cup Final at Wembley Stadium on Saturday 9 May 1959, in front of a crowd of 79,811, and played  in the 20–16 victory over Hunslet in the 1964–65 Challenge Cup Final at Wembley Stadium on Saturday 8 May 1965, in front of a crowd of 89,016.

Billy Boston played , i.e. number 2, and scored a try in Wigan's 16–13 victory over Oldham in the 1957–58 Lancashire Cup Final at Station Road, Swinton on Saturday 29 October 1966.

Billy Boston represented Other Nationalities (RL) while at Wigan, he played right- in the 2–19 defeat by St. Helens at Knowsley Road, St. Helens on Wednesday 27 January 1965, to mark the switching-on of new floodlights.

Towards the end of his career, Boston played for Blackpool Borough, making his final appearance in 1970. He scored a total of 571 tries in his career, making him the second highest all-time try scorer in the history of the game after Brian Bevan.

Boston became one of fewer than twenty-five Welshmen to have scored more than 1,000-points in their rugby league career.

After retirement
After finishing his playing career, he took over the running of the Griffin Hotel pub near Central Park until his retirement. The Billy Boston Stand at Central Park was named in his honour. Similarly, the East Stand at the DW Stadium was officially renamed after Billy Boston in 2009. In December 2020 Boston was named as one of three Welsh rugby league players to be honoured with a new statue in Cardiff Bay, the other two being Gus Risman and Clive Sullivan.

References

External links
Billy Boston Statistics at wigan.rlfans.com
(archived by web.archive.org) Billy Boston at eraofthebiff.com
(archived by web.archive.org) Billy Boston at Ponty.net
(archived by web.archive.org) Billy Boston at rugbyleaguehistory.co.uk
(archived by web.archive.org) Billy Boston at wales.rleague.com

1934 births
Living people
20th-century British Army personnel
Army rugby union players
Black British sportsmen
British people of Irish descent
Sierra Leone Creole people
Blackpool Borough players
Footballers who switched code
Great Britain national rugby league team players
Members of the Order of the British Empire
Neath RFC players
Other Nationalities rugby league team players
People from Butetown
Pontypridd RFC players
Royal Corps of Signals soldiers
Rugby league centres
Rugby league players from Cardiff
Rugby league wingers
Rugby union players from Cardiff
Welsh people of Sierra Leonean descent
British sportspeople of Sierra Leonean descent
Welsh rugby league players
Welsh rugby union players
Wigan Warriors players